A mixtape (alternatively mix-tape, mix tape or mixed tape) is a compilation of music, typically from multiple sources, recorded onto a medium. With origins in the 1980s, the term normally describes a homemade compilation of music onto a cassette tape, CD, or digital playlist. The songs are either ordered sequentially or made into a continuous programme by beatmatching the songs and creating seamless transitions at their beginnings and endings with fades or abrupt edits. Essayist Geoffrey O'Brien described this definition of the mixtape as "perhaps the most widely practiced American art form".

In hip hop and R&B culture, a mixtape often describes a self-produced or independently released album issued free of charge to gain publicity or avoid possible copyright infringement. However, the term has been applied to a number of releases published for profit in the 2010s, and the line between a release billed as a mixtape and one referred to as a studio album or extended play has become increasingly blurred.

History

Homemade mix tapes became common in the 1980s.  Although the compact audio cassette by Philips appeared at the 1963 Berlin Radio Show, the sound quality of cassettes was not good enough to be seriously considered for music recording until further advances in tape formulations, including the advent of chrome and metal tape. Before the introduction of the audio cassette, the creation of a pop music compilation required specialized or cumbersome equipment, such as a reel-to-reel or 8 track recorder, that was often inaccessible to the casual music fan. As cassette tapes and recorders grew in popularity and portability, these technological hurdles were lowered to the point where the only resources required to create a mix were a handful of cassettes and a cassette recorder connected to a source of pre-recorded music, such as a radio or LP player. The 8-track tape cartridge was more popular for music recording during much of the 1960s, as the cassette was originally only mono and intended for vocal recordings only, such as in office dictation machines.  But improvements in fidelity finally allowed the cassette to become a major player.  The ready availability of the cassette and higher quality home recording decks to serve the casual home user allowed the cassette to become the dominant tape format, to the point that the 8 track tape nearly disappeared shortly after the turn of the 1980s.  The growth of the mixtape was also encouraged by improved quality and increased popularity of audio cassette players in car entertainment systems, and by the introduction of the Sony Walkman in 1979.

A distinction should be drawn between a private mixtape, which is usually intended for a specific listener or private social event, and a public mixtape, or "party tape", usually consisting of a recording of a club performance by a DJ and intended to be sold to multiple individuals. In the 1970s, such DJs as Grandmaster Flash and the Furious Five, Afrika Bambaataa and the Soulsonic Force, Kool Herc and the Herculoids, and DJ Hollywood would often distribute recordings of their club performances via audio cassette, as well as customized recordings (often prepared at exorbitant prices) for individual tape purchasers. These recordings tended to be of higher technical ability than home-made mixtapes and incorporated techniques such as beatmatching and scratching. One 12 October 1974 article in Billboard reported, "Tapes were originally dubbed by jockeys to serve as standbys for times when they did not have disco turntables to hand. The tapes represent each jockey's concept of programming, placing, and sequencing of record sides. The music is heard without interruption. One- to three-hour programs bring anywhere from $30 to $75 per tape, mostly reel-to-reel, but increasingly on cartridge and cassette." Club proprietors, as well as DJs, would often prepare such tapes for sale.

Throughout the 1980s, mixtapes were a highly visible element of youth culture. However, the increased availability of CD burners and MP3 players and the gradual disappearance of cassette players in cars and households have led to a decline in the popularity of the compact audio cassette as a medium for homemade mixes. The high point of traditional mixtape culture was arguably the publication of Nick Hornby's novel High Fidelity in 1995. Since then, mixtapes have largely been replaced by mix CDs and shared MP3 playlists, which are more durable, can hold more songs, and require minutes (rather than hours) to prepare.

Today, websites concerned with electronic music provide mixes in a digital format. These usually consist of recorded DJ sets of live, beat-matched mixes of songs, which are used by DJs seeking to demonstrate their mixing skills to an online audience. Some radio shows worldwide specialize in mix series, including The Breezeblock on BBC Radio 1, The Solid Steel Show (formerly on KISS-FM), and Eddy Temple-Morris/The Remix on Xfm.

Additionally, DJs such as Grandmaster Flash, DJ QBert, DJ Spooky, DJ Z-Trip or DJ Shadow, The Avalanches, and Rjd2 have gained fame for creating new songs by combining fragments of existing songs (which need not necessarily belong to the same genre). The resulting remix or mash-up can be seen as an evolution of the mixtape, in that it appropriates existing songs to give them new meanings through their juxtaposition, but does so in a quicker, more integrated style. This practice is heavily derived from the use of song loops as musical backdrops for an MC's rhymes in hip hop music, which is also related to turntablism.

Legal issues in the United States

Frank Creighton, a director of anti-copyright infringement efforts for the Recording Industry Association of America, considers that "money did not have to be involved for copying to be illegal".

Aesthetic

While the process of recording a mix onto an audio cassette from LPs or compact discs is technically straightforward, many music fans who create more than one mixtape are eventually compelled to confront some of the practical and aesthetic challenges involved in the mixtape format. From a practical standpoint, such issues as avoiding an excessive amount of blank tape at the end of one side (which requires careful planning of the length of each side of the mix) and reducing the audible click between songs (which requires mastery of the pause button on the cassette recorder) have been identified as part of the shared experience of mixtape aficionados. From an aesthetic point of view, many enthusiasts believe that because a tape player, unlike a CD player, lacks the ability to skip from song to song, the mixtape needs to be considered in its entirety. This requires the mixtape creator to consider the transitions between songs, the effects caused by juxtaposing a soft song with a loud song, and the overall "narrative arc" of the entire tape. One notable listing of such aesthetic "rules" can be found in a paragraph from Nick Hornby's High Fidelity

Many enthusiasts also devote substantial attention to the packaging of a mix tape intended as a gift, sometimes going so far as to create cover art and customized liner notes. The cover of the original McSweeney's edition of 31 Songs, a 2003 essay collection by Nick Hornby, was intended to suggest the packaging of a homemade mixtape, with the Side A half (of a Maxell cassette J-card) as the front cover and the Side B half on the back cover. It also came with an actual CD featuring ten of the songs discussed in the text. Indeed, the look of mix tapes, featuring hand-written notes on the recording medium manufacturer's supplied labels, has become one of the aesthetic conventions of modern design, a distinct style that designers may attempt to copy or cite.  Many have been so widely distributed that the CDDB has logged and can identify ID3 tags when a disc mix tape is inserted into a PC.

From an artistic point of view, many creators of mix tapes seem to regard them as a form of emotional self-expression, although whether a mix tape retains the same web of emotional associations when passed from its creator to the recipient is, at best, debatable. Some argue that in selecting, juxtaposing, or even editing originally unrelated tracks of pop music into a new work of art, the "author" of a mix tape moves from passive listener to archivist, editor, and finally active participant in the process of musical creation. (Some legitimacy for this viewpoint was provided by Cassette Stories, a 2003 exhibition at the Museum of Communication in Hamburg, Germany, which featured stories and submissions from eighty mix tape enthusiasts.) However, this perception of the mix tape as a work of art has been criticized as resulting in a sort of elitism, with creators becoming more concerned with finding arcane and surprising combinations of tracks than with creating a tape that is listenable, enjoyable, or appropriate to its intended recipient. (In High Fidelity, for example, the narrator's girlfriend complains that his mix tapes are too didactic.) On a very basic level, the creation of a mix tape can be seen as an expression of the individual compiler's taste in music, often put forward for the implicit approval of the tape's recipient, and in many cases as a tentative step towards building the compiler's personal canon of pop music.

In hip hop

1980s–1990s
In hip hop's earliest days, the music only existed in live form. Performers' music was spread via tapes of parties and shows. Hip hop mixtapes first appeared in the mid-1970s in New York City, featuring artists such as Kool Herc and Afrika Bambaataa.

In the mid-1980s, DJs, such as Brucie B, began recording their live music and selling them as mixtapes, which was soon followed by other DJs, like Kid Capri and Doo Wop. Ron G moved the mixtape forward in the early 1990s by blending R&B a cappellas with hip hop beats (known as "blends"). Blend tapes were developed to promote one or more new artists, or as a pre-release by more established artists to promote upcoming "official" albums. Often, mixtapes contain "freestyles" with vocals placed over the instrumentals of a preexisting song.

2000s–present
In the 21st century, mixtapes in hip hop are typically released as holdovers or low-key releases between studio albums. Underground or unsigned artists typically release them free online on websites such as SoundCloud, Datpiff, or HotNewHipHop, while prominent industry artists may release "commercial mixtapes" on streaming services. Notable examples include Street Gossip by Lil Baby, MMM (Money Making Mitch) by Puff Daddy, If You're Reading This It's Too Late by Drake.

See also

 Compilation album
 Compressed audio optical disc
 DJ mix
 Mix Tape: The Art of Cassette Culture
 Portable media player
 Video mixtape

References

Further reading

 Ellis, Bret Easton (1986). Less Than Zero. .
 Erdman, Sarah (2003). Nine Hills to Nambonkaha: Two Years in the Heart of an African Village. .
 Gallagher, David (30 January 2003). "For the mix tape, a digital upgrade and notoriety". The New York Times.
 Hornby, Nick (1995). High Fidelity. .
 Hornby, Nick (2003). Songbook. .
 Keller, Joel (22 January 2004). PCs killed the mix-tape star. Salon.
 Mobley, Max (5 December 2007). "Requiem for the Mixtape". Crawdaddy!.
 Moore, Thurston (2004). Mix Tape. .
 McMahon, Andrew (2005): "The Mixed Tape", Everything in Transit—Jack's Mannequin.
 O'Brien, Geoffrey (2004). Sonata for Jukebox. .
 Paul, James (26 September 2003). Last night a mix tape saved my life. The Guardian.
 Sante, Luc (13 May 2004). Disco Dreams. The New York Review of Books. (This review of Songbook and Sonata for Jukebox describes the mix tape as "one part Victorian flower album, one part commonplace book, one part collage, and one part recital.")
 Stuever, Hank (29 October 2002). "Unspooled: In the digital age, the quaint cassette is sent reeling into history's dustbin". The Washington Post.
 Vowell, Sarah (2001). Take the Cannoli: Stories from the New World. .
 Warner, Alan (1995). Morvern Callar. .

Sound production technology
 
Compilation albums
Audiovisual ephemera